Eurrhypis is a genus of moths of the family Crambidae.

Species
Eurrhypis cacuminalis (Eversmann, 1843)
Eurrhypis guttulalis (Herrich-Schäffer, 1848)
Eurrhypis pollinalis (Denis & Schiffermüller, 1775)
Eurrhypis sartalis (Hübner, 1813)

References

Eurrhypini
Crambidae genera
Taxa named by Jacob Hübner